Ludovico Maria Sforza (27 July 1452 – 27 May 1508), also known as Ludovico il Moro ("the Moor").  "Arbiter of Italy", according to the expression used by Guicciardini, was an Italian Renaissance nobleman who ruled as Duke of Milan from 1494 to 1499. 

Endowed with rare intellect and very ambitious, he managed to acquire dominion over Milan, first subtracting the regency from his unwary sister-in-law Bona, then taking over from his late nephew Gian Galeazzo who, it is said, he had poisoned. An enlightened, generous and peaceful prince, he became the patron of artists and writers. During his rule of Milan, his court became one of the most splendid in Europe. By temperament, he was nervous and indecisive. To face the threats of King Alfonso II of Naples, he called the French to Italy; when threatened by the French, he could not face the danger, and escaped only thanks to the intervention of his wife Beatrice. When she died, he went into depression, his court turned "from glad heaven to dark hell", and he finally succumbed to the King of France Louis XII, who took him prisoner in France, where he ended his days miserably.

Early life

Childhood 
Ludovico Sforza was born on 27 July 1452 at Vigevano, in what is now Lombardy. His position as the fourth son of Francesco I Sforza and Bianca Maria Visconti meant that he was not expected to become ruler of Milan, but his mother still encouraged a broad education.

Education 
Under the tutelage of the humanist Francesco Filelfo, Ludovico studied painting, sculpture and letters along with methods of government and warfare.

Despite being a fourth-born son and therefore without great hopes of rising to the ducal dignity, his mother Bianca wanted him to be educated in the name of the Renaissance spirit and to receive a vast education, especially in the field of classical letters. Under the tutelage of many preceptors, including the humanist Francesco Filelfo and the poet Giorgio Valagussa, Ludovico received lessons in Greek, Latin, theology, painting, sculpture, as well as being instructed in matters of government and administration of the state. To the humanities alternated physical exercise in the form of fencing, hunting, wrestling, horseback riding, jumping, dancing and the game of rope ball.Cicco Simonetta describes him as the most versed and rapid in learning among the children of Francesco Sforza who, as well as his mother Bianca, showed him particular attention, witnessed by the extensive correspondence. At the age of seven, in Mantua, together with his mother and brothers, he welcomed Pope Pius II on a visit to the city, making the first public outing on an official occasion. At the age of eleven, he dedicated an oration in Latin to his father.

Under the rule of Galeazzo Maria 
When their father Francesco died in 1466, the family titles devolved upon Galeazzo Maria, the elder brother. Ludovico was conferred the courtesy title of Count of Mortara.

After ten days Ludovico was already in Cremona to keep the lands of the duchy united and encourage the inhabitants of the city to pay tributes of loyalty to the new duke.

He continued to deal with diplomatic missives, remaining in Cremona until the following year, when he went to Genoa to welcome his sister Ippolita, wife of Alfonso of Aragon, receiving that same year the title of Count of Mortara. On 6 June 1468 he was again in Genoa to welcome Bona of Savoy and escorted her together with his brother Tristan to Milan where, on 7 July, the wedding with Duke Galeazzo Maria took place. He was again ambassador then to the King of France and then to Bologna. In January 1471 he went to Venice, on behalf of the duke, with a rich procession and gave a speech very well received by the doge and which helped to improve diplomatic reactions between the Duchy of Milan and the Republic of Venice. In March 1471 he accompanied Galeazzo Maria on his sumptuous journey to Florence, he passed in August of the same year to Rome for the coronation of Pope Sixtus IV and then in September to the court of Turin.

Galeazzo Maria seemed to have a particular predilection for him: in 1471 he had established in his will that, dying without grandchildren, the Duchy of Milan passed to Ludovico even before the other brothers. The latter covered his well-known relationship with Lucia Marliani, signing the deeds of donation for the countess. A clear change occurred in 1476, when he was sent to France together with his brother Sforza Maria, in a sort of disguised exile. Bona later accused the two brothers-in-law of having plotted to assassinate the duke, only to deny the accusation once he had made peace with Ludovico, so that it is not possible to establish the reasons for that exile. According to the official version of Galeazzo Maria, it was his own brothers who asked him for permission to "go and see the world".

Rise to power 
The assassination of Duke Galeazzo Maria then took place on 26 December 1476, at the hands of other authors. He was succeeded by his son Gian Galeazzo Maria, then only seven years old. Upon hearing the news, Ludovico Sforza hastily returned from France. Together with two other brothers, Ascanio and Ottaviano, as well as the condottieri Roberto Sanseverino, Donato del Conte and Ibletto Fieschi, Sforza and Ludovico tried to oppose the regency of Bona, since the duchy was in fact in the hands of the ducal councilor Cicco Simonetta. The attempt failed. Ludovico was exiled to Pisa, Sforza Maria to Bari, Ascanio to Perugia. Octavian instead tried to wade the Adda in full and drowned there. Roberto Sanseverino fled to France, Donato del Conte was imprisoned in the "ovens" of Monza and Ibletto Fieschi in the Castello Sforzesco.In February 1479 the Moro and Sforza Maria, induced by Ferrante of Aragon, entered with an army in the Republic of Genoa, where they joined Roberto Sanseverino and Ibletto Fieschi. The Duchess Bona of Savoy and Cicco Simonetta convinced Federico Gonzaga and Ercole d'Este to gather an army and come to their rescue against the payment of a large sum of money. A second army led by Roberto Malatesta and Costanzo Sforza, supporting the Florentines, would have faced the troops of the pontiff and the Neapolitan ones.

On 1 March Ludovico and his brother were declared rebels and enemies of the Duchy and were revoked the income they received by virtue of their mother's dowry. After carrying out looting in Pisa, the two returned to La Spezia. However, already in mid-May peace negotiations were established between the two sides.

On 29 July Sforza Maria died near Varese Ligure, according to many poisoned on commission of Cicco Simonetta, according to others of natural death, and Ferrante appointed the Moro Duke of Bari. Following Roberto Sanseverino, on 20 August Ludovico resumed the march to Milan at the head of an army of 8,000 men, crossing the Passo di Centocroci and going up the Sturla Valley. On 23 August he took the citadel of Tortona after having corrupted the Castellan Rafagnino Donati. He then went up to Sale, Castelnuovo Scrivia, Bassignana and Valenza.

After these successes, Simonetta sent Ercole d'Este, Duke of Ferrara, to stop the rebels with weapons. However, many nobles close to the duchess pushed for reconciliation. Bona finally allowed himself to be persuaded by his lover, Antonio Tassino, probably in league with  Ludovico, to forgive his brother-in-law, and so on 7 September, Ludovico entered the castle of Milan. Simonetta, knowing his cunning, firmly opposed reconciliation and prophesied to the Duchess Bona of Savoy:"I will lose my head and you in the process of time will lose the state".

The Milanese Ghibelline nobility, which had Pietro Pusterlaas as a reference, took advantage of Ludovico's presence in Milan to try to convince him to get rid of Simonetta, reminding him of all the sufferings that he and his brothers had had to suffer because of Cicco: exile, war, the death of Octavian and Donato del Conte and finally the poisoning of Sforza Maria, to which Ludovico had been very attached. However, he did not consider Cicco a danger and judged it unnecessary to condemn to death a man now quite old and moreover sick with gout. Therefore, Pietro Pusterla planned an armed revolt against the ducal secretary and seeking the support of the Marquis of Mantua and Monferrato as well as Giovanni Bentivoglio and Alberto Visconti.

Ludovico, fearing a popular uprising, was forced to imprison Cicco and his brother Giovanni, who were transferred on a cart to the prisons of the castle of Pavia, while the other family members were released.

Death of Cicco Simonetta and exile of Duchess Bona 
Having obtained power, Ludovico recalled his brother Ascanio and Roberto Sanseverino to Milan; then he sent speakers to forge or re-establish alliances with Lorenzo de' Medici, King Ferrante and Pope Sixtus IV, and averted an alliance against him between the Swiss and the Republic of Venice.

Meanwhile, the Ghibelline nobility, who had helped him in his rise to power, had become unpopular with  Ludovico and had found in Ascanio Sforza the defender of his interests. The Moor, persuaded by Sanseverino, ordered the arrest of his brother and his exile in Ferrara. Pietro Pusterla, Giovanni Borromeo, Antonio Marliani and many other illustrious exponents of the Ghibelline faction were also exiled.
On 30 October Cicco Simonetta was beheaded at the ravelin of the castle of Pavia overlooking Visconteo Park. His death of Simonetta took away the main opponent of Antonio Tassino, who became increasingly arrogant. The Corio tells that when the Moro or other Milanese nobles went to visit him, he used to make them wait a long time outside the door until he had finished combing his hair. The Tassino managed to convince Duchess Bona, now subservient to the man, to replace Filippo Eustachi, prefect of the castle of Porta Giovia, with his father Gabriello, resorting to the intermediation of Giovanni Botta. The prefect did not let himself be corrupted and kept the oath made to the late Duke Galeazzo Maria to keep the castle until the age of majority of Gian Galeazzo.

Ludovico then devised the expedient of secretly leading his nephews Gian Galeazzo and Ermes in the rocca of the castle, under the pretext of protecting them from the ambition of the Tassino, and there he convened the council. Bona was forced to sign the sentence to exile for Antonio and his family but, due to the forced separation from her lover, she gave signs of hysteria: she pretended to leave the duchy and threatened suicide if she was prevented, so that Ludovico and Roberto Sanseverino were persuaded to let her leave for France. On 3 November 1480 Bona ceded the regency to his brother-in-law, who was appointed tutor of the young duke Gian Galeazzo, however, at the insistence of his son, he stopped to reside in Abbiategrasso.In 1481, perhaps by mandate of Bona, there was an attempt at poisoning against Ludovico and Roberto Sanseverino perpetrated by Cristoforo Moschioni, in turn, instigated by the secretary of the Duchess Luigi Becchetti and the doctor Ambrogio Grifi. Moschioni was found innocent. The same year there was a second conspiracy planned by the Duchess against Ludovico, but once again it failed. The intercession of the Kingdom of France and the Duchy of Savoy prevented Bona from the scandal of the trial.

To the regency of the duchy (1480–1494)

Engagement to Beatrice d'Este 
Ludovico initially planned to become Duke of Milan by marrying his sister-in-law Bona, but the latter, in love with the Tassino, thought of getting rid of him by giving him a wife. Thus, in September 1480, she asked Ercole d'Este for the hand of his eldest daughter Isabella. This was not possible because a few days earlier her father had already promised her in marriage to Francesco Gonzaga, Marquis of Mantua. The second daughter Beatrice, five years old, was then proposed to the Moro. Ludovico, consulted by his sister-in-law only in negotiations already underway, could only be happy.  The engagement indeed promised to be more convenient, as Beatrice lived at that time at the Aragonese court of Naples, raised as a daughter by King Ferrante her grandfather, who was very fond of her, and this meant for Ludovico an alliance also with the king of Naples as well as with the Duke of Ferrara. Consulted on the question of the wedding, Ferrante accepted the engagement and on 30 April of that same year the spousals between the two were held. Subsequently, Ludovico no longer wanted the bride to be raised in Naples and so in 1485 Beatrice returned to Ferrara to her father's court.

War of Ferrara 
In May 1482 the Republic of Venice took advantage of the War of the Reds, in which the Duchy of Milan was engaged, to open a new front against the Duchy of Ferrara, supported by the pontiffs and the Genoese, and entrusted the command of the army to Roberto Sanseverino.

Ludovico entered the war in favour of his future father-in-law, Ercole d'Este, and first sent Federico da Montefeltro, then, at the death of this, his half-brother Sforza Secondo. On 6 January 1483, Sixtus IV abandoned the alliance with the Venetians and moved to Ferrara. The Venetians through Costanzo Sforza, who had passed to their pay, devised a plan to make Ludovico abandon the league: on 15 July Roberto crossed the Adda and fortified the bridge; despite the success, there were no revolts; The Moor met in Cremona with Alfonso of Aragon and other representatives of the league and decided to immediately counterattack the Venetians. On 22 July, Alfonso gathered the army of the league in Monza, and the next day Roberto, realizing that the operation had now failed, retired to Bergamo.

In the summer of 1483 Gian Francesco and Galeazzo Sanseverino, Roberto's sons, defected from the Venetian camp to pass respectively to the service of Alfonso of Aragon and Moro. The result was a friendship, the one between Ludovico and Galeazzo, destined to last a lifetime.
On 10 August, the Moor and his brother Ascanio marched to the head of their army in Bergamo, forcing the surrender of many castles and threatening Bergamoitself, and then capturing Romano after three days of siege.Despite repeated successes, none of the armies of the league exploited Venetian weakness to inflict a decisive blow; in fact, the Moor, after capturing Romano, returned to Milan. On 24 April 1484 a council of war of the main exponents of the anti-Venetian league, meeting in the castle of Porta Giovia, decided to continue the war against the Republic of Venice. However, disagreements soon arose between Ludovico and Alfonso of Aragon, who had understood the danger of the Moro and feared he wanted to subjugate his nephew Gian Galeazzo who, being betrothed to Isabella of Aragon, was his son-in-law. The Venetians, knowing that Ludovico had incurred excessive expenses in favour of his father-in-law, offered him peace in exchange for a certain amount of money, provided that the Polesine remained in their hands. Ludovico accepted, despite the peace, signed on 7 August in Bagnolo, went against Ercole d'Este, who went on a rampage.

Marriage and private life
In the meantime, his fiancée Beatrice had reached an age suitable for the wedding and his father had been pressing since 1488 for a date to be set. Ludovico, however, as the omnipresent Este ambassador  informs, had taken with him a girl "very beautiful [...] who goes after him everywhere, and wants all her well and makes every demonstration of it", that is Cecilia Gallerani. For this reason, he postponed the marriage three times, baffling the future in-laws, who believed that he no longer intended to marry their daughter. Hercules had been exhorting the Moor for years to replace his nephew in the effective possession of the Duchy of Milan, for this purpose Beatrice should have procreated a legitimate heir to him as soon as possible. In 1490, however, after thirteen months of total default, Gian Galeazzo had consummated the marriage with his wife Isabella of Aragon, who within a few days found herself pregnant. This event caused on the one hand the irritation of Hercules, on the other, he had to convince the Moor of the need to take a wife.The wedding was set for the following January and on 29 December 1490, during a winter that turned out to be very rigid enough to force the use of sleds, the wedding procession left Ferrara to lead the betrothed to Milan. She was accompanied by her mother and her other relatives. His brother Alfonso and cousin Ercole would have equally married two princesses of the Sforza house on the same occasion: the first Anna Maria, daughter of the late Galeazzo Maria and therefore niece of Ludovico (and sister of Gian Galeazzo), the second Angela, daughter of Carlo Sforza and Bianca Simonetta (daughter of Cicco Simonetta).
On 18 January 1491, with little pomp, Ludovico married Beatrice in the Ducal Chapel of the castle of Pavia. He had wanted the wedding to be celebrated in Pavia and not in Milan precisely so as not to give the impression of wanting to bully Gian Galeazzo, legitimate Duke of Milan, who had married Isabella of Aragon in the Duomo a few months earlier.

The marriage was declared immediately consummated and already the next morning Ludovico left for Milan to finish the preparations for the wedding party, in truth it remained secretly blank for over a month, as the spouses had had the opportunity to know each other only the day before and Ludovico, who at the time was thirty-eight years old, had respect for the youth and innocence of his bride, then fifteen, and did not want to force her to consume in a hurry. He, therefore, waited patiently for Beatrice to give herself to him spontaneously, which required a lot of commitment on his part and which aroused new concerns in his father-in-law Ercole, who pressed through Ambassador Trotti for the marriage to be consummated immediately.

Marital bond 

The relationship between the two spouses soon became idyllic: "S.r Ludovico hardly ever takes his eyes off the Duchess of Bari" wrote Tebaldo Tebaldi in August 1492; and already a short time after the wedding Galeazzo Visconti declared: "there is such a great love between them that I don't think two people can love each other more". Ludovico was seen dedicating continuous kisses and caresses to his wife, he stood beside her "over the bed" for most of the day when she was sick and in a letter he wrote of her: "she is dearer to me than the light of the sun". It is not certain that his wife reciprocated him with the same transport, but some clues lead us to believe so. On the other hand, the contemporaries themselves noted, not without amazement, that Beatrice followed him everywhere, even in the course of her pregnancies, sometimes endangering her life, contrary to the custom of women who were, during the absences of their husbands, to remain to govern the house. They constituted, in the short years they lived together, a model of an ideal couple, united by a love that goes far beyond death.

The 15-year-old princess quickly charmed the Milanese court with her joy in life, her laughter, and even her extravagance. She helped to make Sforza Castle a centre of sumptuous festivals and balls and she loved entertaining philosophers, poets, diplomats and soldiers. Beatrice had good taste, and it is said that under her prompting her husband's patronage of artists became more selective and the likes of Leonardo da Vinci and Donato Bramante were employed at the court. She would become the mother of Maximilian Sforza and Francesco II Sforza, future Dukes of Milan.The correspondence preserves moments of great tenderness, like a letter written to his mother-in-law a few months after the birth of the first-born Ercole Massimiliano, in which Ludovico tells her about the baby's approval and how "my wife and I so naked and naked we let him carry him sometimes and we keep him between the two of us". What is striking is the concern to satisfy his wife in every whim and the concern, manifested to the in-laws, not to let her discover the times when he lied to her, for fear that she "would not love me", as well as the utmost delicacy in participate in mournful events: in 1493 he apologized to his father-in-law for the delay in mourning in Milan, as he was waiting for a better moment to communicate his mother's death to Beatrice, and not to have written to him in his own hand, "because I doubted that my Illustrissima consort "just as he was writing the letter.

Ascension as Duke of Milan and the Italian Wars

Gian Galeazzo and his wife Isabella, after the sumptuous marriage, left Milan to create their own court in Pavia. The young Gian Galeazzo did not seem to wish to rule in place of his uncle Ludovico, but his wife Isabella came into conflict with her cousin Beatrice, as the latter turned out to be more ambitious than her husband and, after giving birth on 25 January 1493, the first son, Ercole Massimiliano, wished that these, and not Isabella's son, was appointed Count of Pavia (title reserved for the heir to the Duchy of Milan).

Isabella then requested the intervention of her grandfather Ferrante, king of Naples, so that her husband, now of age, was entrusted with the effective control of the duchy. Ferrante, however, had no intention of starting a war, on the contrary, he declared that he loved both granddaughters in the same way and invited them to prudence so that the situation remained stable until the king was alive. When Ferrante died, his successor Alfonso did not hesitate, in defence of his daughter Isabella, to occupy the city of Bari as the first act of hostility towards the Moro.

To respond to this manoeuvre, Ludovico then allied himself with Emperor Maximilian and with the King of France Charles VIII, to whom he left the green light to go down to Italy to conquer the kingdom of Naples, which Charles considered his legitimate possession as it was stolen by the Aragonese from the Angevins. Maximilian promised Ludovico il Moro to publicly recognize his succession to the duchy and to defend his rights, thus legitimizing the usurpation that many claimed to the Sforza, and to seal this promise he married Bianca Maria Sforza, sister of the young Gian Galeazzo, who brought him the amazing sum of 400,000 ducats as a dowry. plus another 100,000 for the investiture, as well as many gifts.

On 11 September 1494 Charles VIII arrived in Asti, received with great honours by Ludovico and Beatrice. With him also came his cousin Louis d'Orléans, who was entitled Duke of Milan iure hereditary and aimed at the conquest of that duchy, being a descendant of Valentina Visconti. Despite the latent hostilities, the first months passed under the sign of friendship and the Moor used the charm of his wife to placate the French and thus distract them. However, the jealousies aroused by the handsome Baron of Beauvau convinced him, it seems, to remove Beatrice from Asti.

The ducal investiture 
On 22 October 1494, Duke Gian Galeazzo died in mysterious circumstances: formally for not having followed the treatment prescribed by his personal doctors for an illness that had been dragging on for some time and for the immoderate life he led, but in the opinion of many prominent contemporaries, such as Machiavelli or Guicciardini, the person responsible for this death was his uncle Ludovico, for poisoning; Malaguzzi Valeri strongly disagrees with this opinion, pointing out how Ludovico was really interested in the approval of his nephew, how he often sent him gifts such as dogs, horses and falcons, and how he was kept constantly informed of the care given to him; he also recalls that Gian Galeazzo had begun to manifest the first stomach disorders already at the age of 13 and that in fact he continuously disobeyed the prescriptions of doctors, continuing to pour wine out of measure and to fatigue in continuous hunting trips and in a disordered sexual life.

The Moro immediately succeeded him by the will of the Milanese nobles, to the detriment of the legitimate heirs, thus touching the apex of political power.

Charles VIII meanwhile easily arrived in Naples, however, neither Ludovico nor his wife had ever really wanted to favour him in the conquest, but rather to frighten King Alfonso II and keep him engaged on another front, so as to distract him from Milan. Ludovico had counted on the fact that the lords of Italy, and especially Florence, would not let Charles pass, which instead happened, as Piero il Fatuo, who until then had been the strongest ally of the king of Naples, frightened ended up throwing himself at the feet of the king of France, granting him not only free passage to Tuscany but even Pisa and Livorno, plus the sum of 120,000 florins. Ludovico, at this point, began to seriously worry about the excessive interference of the French and the blatant threats of the Duke of Orléans, so he decided once again to overthrow the alliances, siding with the Holy League.

The siege of Novara 
To respond to the obvious threats of the Duke of Orléans, Louis thought of attacking his fief of Asti, but the move had the opposite effect: Louis d'Orléans anticipated it by occupying with his troops, on 11 June, the city of Novara, going as far as Vigevano.

Ludovico hastened to close himself with his wife and children in the Rocca del Castello in Milan but, not feeling equally safe, he combined with the Spanish ambassador to leave the duchy to take refuge in Spain. As Bernardino Corio writes, this was not followed only by the iron opposition of his wife Beatrice and some members of the council, who convinced him to desist. The situation, however, remained critical: due to the very high expenses incurred for the investiture and dowry of Bianca Maria, the state was on the verge of financial collapse, there was no money to maintain the army and there was fear of a popular uprising. The Comines writes that, if the Duke of Orleans had advanced only a hundred steps, the Milanese army would have passed the Ticino, and he would have managed to enter Milan, since some noble citizens had offered to introduce it.

Some historians speculated that it was a stroke, as he had a paralyzed hand, never left the bedroom and was rarely seen. "The Duke of Milan has lost his feelings," Malipiero writes, "he abandons himself". To worsen the situation contributed to the ambiguity of the father-in-law Ercole d'Este, who was said together with the Florentines to secretly subvert the Orleans, and of the moro leaders themselves.

The disaster was averted by his wife Beatrice who, appointed for the occasion governor of Milan, ensured the loyalty of the nobles, then went in person to the military camp of Vigevano to supervise the order and animate the captains to move against the Duke of Orleans. Guicciardini's opinion is that if the latter had attempted the assault at that time, he would have taken Milan since the defence resided only in Galeazzo Sanseverino, but Beatrice's demonstration of strength was perhaps worth confusing him in making him believe the defences superior to what they were so that he did not dare to try his luck and retreated into Novara. The hesitation was fatal to him, as it allowed Galeazzo to reorganize the troops and surround him, thus forcing him to a long and exhausting siege.

On 6 July 1495, the famous battle of Fornovo took place, the League forces took heavier casualties and were unable to stop Charles' march to Asti. It was on the occasion of this that Ludovico had urgently obtained cannons from a pile of 70 tons of bronze originally prepared for an equestrian statue designed by Leonardo da Vinci.

At the beginning of August also Ludovico, finally healed, returned to deal with the war, and together with his wife went to reside at the Novara camp. On the occasion of their visit, for the pleasure of the Duchess who greatly appreciated the facts of arms, a memorable magazine of the full army was held.

On 24 September, a violent brawl broke out for unclear reasons, following which Francesco Gonzaga invited the Moro to lock up his wife "in the coffers". Since the Germans wanted to make "cruel revenge" against the Italians, Ludovico begged Francesco to save Beatrice, fearing that she would be raped or killed. The marquis "with an intrepid spirit" rode among the Germans and not without great effort managed to mediate peace. "Understanding success, Ludovico became the happiest man in the world, seeming to him that he had recovered the State and his life, and together with honour his wife, for whose safety he feared more than for everything else".

In the meantime, the capitulation of the enemy was awaited, since the Novara garrison was decimated by famine and epidemics; Louis d'Orleans himself was ill with malarial fevers, but in order not to give up every day he urged his men to resist with the false promise that the king would soon come to their rescue. This did not happen and he finally had to declare himself defeated, accepting the safe conduct to reach the camp of King Charles. Of the few surviving soldiers, many died soon after from eating too much fruit after prolonged fasting.

Death of Beatrice 

Meanwhile, in 1496 Beatrice was expecting a third child and it was in this period that Ludovico met Lucrezia Crivelli, lady-in-waiting to his wife, who became his mistress. Beatrice until that moment had not shown herself too jealous of the frequent betrayals of her husband, considering them fleeting distractions and of little importance, but when she realized that Ludovico had this time seriously fallen in love with Lucrezia, she tried to oppose the relationship with all her strength. However, there was no way to distract her husband and throughout 1496 Ludovico continued to attend more or less secretly the Lucrezia, in a regime of substantial bigamy, so much so that he ended up impregnating both his wife and lover within a couple of months. Beatrice, who was also sincerely in love with her husband, reacted by refusing him her own and the relationship between the couple reached a breaking point. Finally, deeply humiliated, disappointed, embittered, especially saddened by the premature and tragic death of the very young Bianca Giovanna, her dearest friend, Beatrice died in childbirth in the night between 2 and 3 January 1497.

Ludovico in mourning 

Ludovico, who had betrayed her so brazenly, went mad with grief, never recovered from the death of his wife, who had until then been his strength and support in the government of the state. He had always been convinced that he would die before her and in his abilities he had placed all his hopes for the maintenance of the state during the minority of the children."And true, the death of Beatrice, the superb and intelligent Ferrarese, was a serious disaster for Ludovico il Moro. She was the soul of all his undertakings, she was the true queen of his heart and his court [...]. If the Duke of Bari [...] managed to represent on the theater of Europe a scene of much superior, as was observed, to his condition, it is largely due to this woman, vain feminally, if you will, and cruel, especially with the Duchess Isabella, but of resolute and tenacious character, of ready ingenuity, of soul open to all the seductions of luxury and to all the attractions of art. When it [...] failed [...] it was like a great storm that came to upset the soul of Ludovico. Nor did he ever recover from it; that death was the beginning of his misfortunes. Gloomy premonitions crossed his mind; it seemed to him that he had remained alone in a great stormy sea and inclined, fearfully, to asceticism. [...] the ghost of his beautiful and poor dead man was always before his spirit."

(Rodolfo Renier, Gaspare Visconti)For two weeks he was locked in the dark in his apartments, after which he allowed his beard to grow, wearing from then on only black clothes with a cloak torn up by a beggar. His only concern became the embellishment of the family mausoleum and the neglected state fell into disrepair, at a time when the Duke of Orléans, driven by fierce hatred, threatened a second expedition against Milan.

With these few words on that same night, he announced the departure of his wife to the Marquis of Mantua Francesco Gonzaga, husband of his sister-in-law Isabella:He told the Ferrarese ambassador that "he never thought he could ever tolerate such a bitter plague", and that he had had him summoned to report to Duke Ercole that if what had ever offended her, as he knew he had done, he asks forgiveness from your ex. your and her, finding himself discontented to the soul ", since" in every prayer, he had always prayed to our Lord God that she left after him, as the one in whom he had assumed all his rest, and since God did not like it, he prayed to him and would always pray to him continually, that if it is ever possible for a living person to see a dead, grant him the grace that he may see her and speak to her one last time, as the one he loved more than himself ".

Even the Sanudo writes that "Whose death the duke could not bear for the great love that brought her, and said that he no longer wanted to take care of either his children, or the state, or worldly things, and just wanted to live [...] and since then this duke began to feel great troubles, while before he had always lived happily".

The Anonymous Ferrarese even reports that Ludovico, during the funeral, wanted to remarry the deceased as if she were alive, confirming the wedding vows, an act perhaps unprecedented. He begged his brother-in-law Francis not to send anyone to condolersi with him, "not to renew the pain";  likewise, he refused, with a few exceptions, to receive condolences from anyone. To the ambassadors he imposed that no one should appoint Beatrice anymore, nor "did he grieve, nor make a sign of sadness; but they should speak of state matters".

Conversely, and in contradiction, he did not miss an opportunity to remember his wife himself, of whom he created almost a cult: in addition to having a coin minted with the effigy of her on the reverse – something very singular, since before then it had never happened that the face of the wife accompanied that of the lord in the coinage – he adopted more and more often the coat of arms bipartite with the Este and Sforza weapons (which was the one used by his wife), and had the effigy of her reproduced on the carnelian of the ring with the seal she wore on her finger, replacing a previous head of the Roman emperor.  To Cristoforo Solari he commissioned a magnificent funeral monument with their two lying figures carved in marble, declaring that "pleasing to God he would one day rest next to his wife until the end of the world".

For a whole year, he vowed to eat standing, on a tray supported by a servant and imposed fasting at court every Tuesday, the day of his wife's death. In the castle he had a room all decorated in black prepared, which was then known as Saletta Negra, where he retired to mourn his wife in solitude, and wherever he went he wanted his quarters to be paraded in black. Every day he went at least twice to visit his tomb, never missing, so that the ambassadors who wanted to talk to him found him more often in Santa Maria delle Grazie than in the castle. He became convinced that God was punishing him for his sins and, if on the one hand his religiosity increased, on the other he began to take an interest in necromancy.

Such exasperated manifestations of mourning struck all contemporaries, although they were later interpreted by some historians as a farce conducted artfully, due to the fact that although it seems that at first Ludovico had interrupted the relationship with Lucrezia Crivelli, however in 1500 the woman found herself pregnant again. If this were the case, however, it is not clear to whom this farce could be addressed, nor what sense it would have had to continue it for so long. Even in the most critical moments, that is, on the day of his escape from Milan, his last thought – as Corio reports – was to visit his wife's tomb before leaving.

Downfall and aftermath 

Charles VIII died childless in 1498, so the Duke of Orleans succeeded him as Louis XII of France. He then decided to take revenge for the humiliation suffered by undertaking a second expedition against the Duchy of Milan. Lacking this time the valuable help of his wife, Ludovico proved unable to face the enemy.Louis XII entrusted the leadership of the army for the conquest of Milan to the famous leader Gian Giacomo Trivulzio, a personal enemy of the Moro, against whom he meditated on vengeance purposes.

Since the Pisans preferred the protection of Venice (the city had already been subject to the Lord of Milan under the Visconti), Ludovico withdrew his troops from Pisa, having lost all hope of being able to take charge of the Tuscan city. He then reversed the alliance with Venice, militarily helping Florence for the reconquest of Pisa, hoping that the Florentine Republic would help him at least with diplomacy against the arrival of King Louis XII.

The move turned out to be wrong, indeed it deprived him of a precious ally, Venice, which had helped him concretely since the battle of Fornovo, certainly not making him the help of Florence, of which the Duchy of Milan had always been a proud opponent since the fifteenth century before Sforza and Medici started a personal friendship. All this was evident at the second descent into Italy of the King of France: Louis XII allied himself with Venice, which at this point was eager to take revenge for Ludovico's about-face in Pisa, and Gian Giacomo Trivulzio passed with the exercise in Italy.

Ludovico preferred to flee and together with his sons and his brother Ascanio took refuge in Innsbruck with Emperor Maximilian I of Habsburg, leaving Milan on 1 September 1499. Of the Sanseverino brothers, Galeazzo,  and  had followed him,  was instead with a blatant about-face passed to the service of the King of France. Immediately after the departure of the duke, also thanks to the revolt of the Milanese people oppressed by taxes, the Trivulzio entered triumphantly in Milan. Of this tragic event, which inaugurated a period of wars and foreign invasions on the peninsula, Machiavelli directly blamed Ludovico il Moro and the policy he carried out, a historical judgment with which many historians agreed over the centuries, but which today many tend to review.

In Venice there were rumors that Ludovico, in Germany, had gone mad: that he had converted to Islam, had stabbed his son-in-law Galeazzo to death and wounded his brother Ascanio, then he had been chained, but these were false rumors. Having learned that the population had now in hatred of foreign oppression, due to the abuses of the French, Ludovico hired in Germany a mercenary army of Swiss and at the beginning of 1500, assisted by his brother Ascanio and the Sanseverino, he tried to regain possession of Milan. Here, almost redeemed, he declared to the people that he was now much delighted by the "craft of arms", and that "he liked the name of captain more than of lord". you won't be able to keep me here!".

However, the situation backfired during the siege of Novara, when the Swiss refused to participate in the battle. On 10 April, the Swiss garrison was leaving Novara, passing a cordon formed by the Swiss on the French side. French officers were posted to oversee their exit. As the disguised Sforza passed the cordon, one mercenary Hans (or Rudi) Turmann of Uri made signs giving away Sforza's identity and he was apprehended by the French along with the Sanseverino brothers. A few days later, Ascanio, who had attempted to escape to Germany, was also captured.

Girolamo Priuli comments in this regard: "Trivulzio, seeing these prisoners, and above all Signor Lodovico, thinks, oh reader, what joy!!"

Immediately, having led the duke to his presence, Gian Giacomo addressed to him – according to Andrea Prato – these contemptuous words:

With the arrival of the French, Milan lost its independence and remained under foreign domination for 360 years. Among the spoils of war taken by the French, there was also the great Visconti-Sforza Library which was located (together with a part of the ducal archive) in the castle of Pavia and consisted of over 900 manuscripts, including some that belonged to Francesco Petrarca. Of the codices of the library of the Dukes of Milan,400 are still preserved today at the Bibliothèque nationale de France, while others ended up in Italian, European or American libraries.

The French rewarded Turmann for his treason with 200 gold crowns (corresponding to five years' salary of a mercenary); he escaped to France, but after three years (or, according to some sources, after one year) he returned home to Uri. Turmann was immediately arrested for treason, and on the following day he was executed by decapitation.

Imprisonment and death 
Ludovico was taken prisoner to France, passing through Asti, Susa and Lyon, where he arrived on 2 May. Louis XII of France, despite the insistence of Emperor Maximilian to free Ludovico, refused to comply with the requests, indeed humiliated the former duke, refusing even to meet him, while continuing to treat him as a special prisoner, allowing him to go fishing and receive friends. In Venice already in 1501 news arrived that "his brain was wavering a lot" and had become crazy, according to some because of the "melancholy", according to others for fiction, in order to obtain greater freedom. The king, therefore, sent his personal physician to treat him, along with a court dwarf to cheer him up.

He was first detained at the castle of Pierre-Scize, then at Lys-Saint-Georges near Bourges. In 1504 he was moved to the castle of Loches where he was given even more freedom. In 1508, Ludovico attempted to escape; he was thereafter deprived of amenities including his books and spent the rest of his life in the castle's dungeon, where he died on 27 May 1508.

The Swiss later restored the Duchy of Milan to Ludovico's son, Maximilian Sforza. His other son, Francesco II, also held the duchy for a short period. Francesco II died in 1535, sparking the Italian War of 1536–1538, as a result of which Milan passed to the Spanish Empire.

The memory of Ludovico was clouded for centuries by Machiavelli's accusation that he 'invited' Charles VIII to invade Italy, paving the way for subsequent foreign domination. The charge was perpetuated by later historians who espoused the idea of national independence. More recent historians, however, placing the figure of Ludovico in its Renaissance setting, have reevaluated his merits as a ruler and given a more equitable assessment of his achievement.

Appearance and personality

Ludovico "the tyrant" 
Excellent duke in times of peace, very bad in times of war, Ludovico was never brought neither for weapons nor for the exercises of the body, he was indeed a man with a mild, conciliatory character, he detested all forms of violence and cruelty, and in fact, the more he could keep away from the battlefields, he held himself, and the more he could refrain from inflicting harsh punishments on the guilty, he abstained.He, therefore, does not deserve the fame of "tyrant" that is sometimes attributed to him, which if anything belonging to his brother Galeazzo Maria Sforza, duke before him, who used to torment his subjects and even his friends with unspeakable torture and cruelty (of which Bernardino Corio has handed down a summary list), and subtract for his own pleasure the women of others, to such an extent that this was the cause of his killing at the hands of noble conspirators in 1476.Perhaps just taking the fraternal example as a warning, Ludovico always refrained from any excess. It can be said that he was even unable to bring hatred, if in the last years of his life, now imprisoned in the prison of Loches by King Louis XII who had deprived him of the state, the title, the wealth and even his own children, Ludovico found nothing better to do than write a memorial "of the things of Italy" for Louis XII himself, in which he explained to the sovereign what was the best way to govern Lombardy and recommended him to caress the Florentines, not to antagonize the Pope and never to trust the Venetians, "who are too powerful and never die [...] nor should his Majesty trust them for any time, because he can well take an example from me, who was their ally, as they betrayed me".

Physical appearance 
Aliprando Caprioli says: "he was not well disposed of body, but beautiful of face; and of generous presence".

Over the years, without the necessary physical training, he gained more and more weight, then lost weight only after the death of his wife (due to the continuous fasting) and the capture, and then returned to being "fatter than ever", as described by ambassador Domenico Trevisan, after having become accustomed to imprisonment.

He was therefore not used to wearing the tight-attillated farsetti typical of young men and condottieri, but rather clothes that reached him just above the knee. However, he had broad shoulders and highlighted them with solid gold chains, as can be seen in the so-called Sforza Altarpiece. From an early age, he had eyes, hair and a dark complexion, which therefore derived his nickname. Even the Ferrarese chronicler Girolamo Ferrarini, who met him twenty-five years old in 1477, describes him as "of noble and beautiful appearance, although he is brown in the face". Still in 1492 the Venetian ambassadors called him a "beautiful man". After middle age he suffered from several diseases, such as gout and asthma.

Personality 

Certainly, Ludovico was prodigal with his friends, very liberal, condescending, thoughtful and human, however, he turned out to be a very little energetic man, if not spurred on, and with the hereafter (perhaps as a result of the aforementioned stroke) he became increasingly contradictory and unstable. In this regard, Camillo Porzio's judgment is exemplary:Paolo Giovio, who instead has very harsh words for Beatrice, describes him as follows:

Sometimes he knew how to be boastful, as when in 1496 he boasted that Pope Alexander was his chaplain, Emperor Maximilian his general, Venice his chamberlain, and the King of France his courier who had to come and go to Italy at his will. Guicciardini says it "a very vigilant prince of very acute ingenuity", and elsewhere: "I do not lack shy in adversity, which immoderate in prosperity, as almost always is combined in the same subject insolence with shyness, demonstrated with useless tears his cowardice".

, angry at the peace of Bagnolo, calls him a man who "does not love a person except out of fear or need" and says: "he is mendacious, he is vindicative, very greedy, without shame, greedy for other people's things [...], in superlative pusillanimous, not to be trusted just [...] he is ambitious and never says good about anyone." He adds that he belongs to the kind of those who first say one thing, then do another; who has no love for anyone and no one loves him, and who is convinced that he can underestimate the other powerful of Italy, and for this reason he loses the friendship of all.

The chronicler Andrea Prato, who harshly reproaches him for having preferred Galeazzo Sanseverino to Gian Giacomo Trivulzio, paints a merciless picture, saying that he was indeed of rare and prudent intellect, but fearful, to such an extent that he seemed to abhor not only battles but even to hear about atrocious and cruel things, which is why he was not loved by soldiers, who want a spirited gentleman to stand by their side and expose himself to danger with them.

In his wife, a woman of strong character and a lover of war, thus able to make up for her husband's failings, he found his most faithful and valid collaborator, so much so that her death marked her downfall. Beatrice trusted blindly, granted her great freedom and entrusted her with important tasks, making her always a participant in the councils and negotiations of war. As a husband he was, therefore, at least at the beginning, almost impeccable, and if it had not been for the continuous betrayals nothing could have been reproached in this regard. Some historians, wandering, claimed that he beat his wife, but the confusion arises from a letter of 1492, in which it is written that the Duke of Milan had "beaten" his wife: Duke of Milan was then called Gian Galeazzo, who in accordance with his character was in fact used to mistreat his wife Isabella, nor therefore Ludovico ever allowed himself to make such a gesture towards that woman who "loved more than himself".

Even as a father he was attentive, loving and present, great was the love he showed above all towards his own daughter, Bianca Giovanna, and unbearable the pain he showed for his untimely unexpected death.

Love for the land 
The great passion of Ludovico, more than women, more than food and more than the government, was indeed agriculture: Ludovico liked to remember that his grandfather, Muzio Attendolo, before becoming a leader was born a farmer, and he himself was an expert grower of vines and mulberries, the famous moròn, with whom they fed the silkworms that made the Milanese industry famous. He gave life to his own farm near Vigevano, the so-called Sforzesca, with adjacent the Pecorara where various species of cattle, sheep and other animals were bred, which Ludovico loved very much and where he often visited with his wife Beatrice, like him a lover of nature. It was no coincidence that he employed Leonardo da Vinci almost more as an engineer than as an artist, using his knowledge to build a series of aqueducts useful for irrigating those lands that are naturally arid. In the end he decided, by the official act of 28 January 1494, to donate the Sforzesca, along with many other lands, to his beloved Beatrice, and this seems even more significant if we consider that from that company alone Ludovico received annually very rich incomes.

He invested also in horse and cattle breeding, and the metal industry. Some 20,000 workers were employed in the silk industry. He sponsored extensive work in civil and military engineering, such as canals and fortifications, continued work on the Cathedral of Milan and the Certosa of Pavia and had the streets of Milan enlarged and adorned with gardens. The University of Pavia flourished under him. There were some protests at the heavy taxation necessary to support these ventures, and a few riots resulted.

Astrology 
Perhaps precisely because of his own insecurities, he was obsessed with astrology, so much so that the courtiers of Ferrara noticed that in Milan nothing was done unless Ambrose of Rosate, astrologer and personal doctor of Ludovico, had first consulted the stars.

Culture 
He was a cultured man, he knew Latin and French and whenever he could he stopped to listen to the daily reading and commentary of the Divine Comedy that the humanist Antonio Grifo kept at the behest of Duchess Beatrice, who was very passionate about it. After her death and her capture, Ludovico asked as his last wish to be able to keep with him a book of Dante's work which he read continuously during his captivity, whose triplets he delighted in writing, translated into French, on the walls of his cell, along with some of his other nostalgic thoughts imbued with wisdom.

Loves

Ludovico "the seducer" 
Endowed, in the best years, with great charm and charisma, Ludovico acquired fame as a seducer. It is due to Francesco Guicciardini the news – probably unfounded – of his falling in love with his niece Isabella of Aragon, which would have led him to deal with his nephew so that he could not consummate the marriage. He even boasted, in 1498, that it was out of jealousy of his wife that the Marquis Francesco Gonzaga played the double game between him and the Lordship of Venice, insinuating his relationship with his sister-in-law Isabella d'Este. These rumors, spread to Venice, outraged both the Marquis and his father-in-law Ercole, who hastened to deny them. Isabella certainly always had a soft spot for Louis, and envied her sister for her fortunate marriage, wealth, and children, but it is not proven that she was actually his mistress.

Lovers 
Despite the lively love for his wife, Ludovico had lovers both before and during the wedding, like any other gentleman of the time. The first two of which we have news, such Romana and Bernardina de' Corradis, were probably of low social extraction. In July 1485 Ludovico speaks in a letter "of the pleasure that I already took a few days ago with a young Milanese, notable by blood, very honest and beautiful as much as I could have desired",, sister of a Galeazzo Gallerani, and therefore identified by Léon-Gabriel Pélissier with an Isabella Gallerani, while for other historians it would already be the best known Cecilia. This last one, however, officially appeared at court only in the summer of 1489, when the ambassador Giacomo Trotti attributed the cause of a certain malaise of the Moro to the "too much coitus with one of his girls whom he took with him, very beautiful, several days ago, who goes after him everywhere, and wants her all his good and shows him every possible way". Cecilia remained at court until the first months of 1491, when she was ousted by the new Duchess Beatrice, and for some time there are no more names of lovers. 

In February–March 1495, coinciding with the second birth of Beatrice, Ludovico had an adventure with an Isabella Trotti da Casate (friend of Isabella d'Este, who actually came to assist her sister), of which a cloying letter addressed to him is preserved, in which he laments the lack and signs "She who is for your Lordship what you do not want me to say", that is, suggesting that Louis did not want her to call herself his lover, perhaps out of respect for his wife, who moreover read his correspondence. Shortly afterwards he had to undertake the well-known relationship with Lucrezia Crivelli, already married, which caused him – as it would seem – a marriage crisis, in fact from the Anonymous Ferrarese we know that in 1496 "All his pleasure was with one of his maids, who was the damsel of his wife [...] with whom he had not slept for good months, so that he was unwanted",  while the Muralto specifies that Beatrice "was honored with great care by Ludovico, although he welcomed Lucrezia as a concubine from the Crivelli family; because of which, no matter how much the thing gnawed the bowels of his wife, love nevertheless did not stray from her".  The relationship officially lasted until the defeat of Ludovico, despite his phase of rigorous asceticism following widowhood, since Lucrezia did not follow him, but rather sought refuge with the marquises of Mantua, taking away the son they had had together and the enormous wealth accumulated thanks to their services.Uncertain is the nature of the relationship he had instead with Graziosa Maggi, another beautiful lady of Beatrice, called "Graziosa Pia" because she was the wife of Ludovico Pio di Carpi, to whom Ludovico made a generous dowry. In August 1498 he addressed a letter to her in which every word can be explained honestly, except for a sentence: "We will remind you of this alone: that you are loved by us only, thus deserving your virtues and customs". Only hypotheses can be made about the beautiful Ippolita Fioramonte, a young lady of Beatrice, who boasted, after the death of the duchess, a protection difficult to explain by Ludovico, who gave her a princely dowry.  A more genuine friendship bound him instead to women like Chiara Gonzaga, sister of the Marquis Francesco, in relation to whom someone even spoke of marriage, a misunderstanding that Ludovico hastened to clarify. 

Speech to itself deserves the very strong bond that he had since 1483 with Galeazzo Sanseverino, who continuously covered with honors and privileges, to the point of marrying him the only daughter and appointing him regent together with his wife Beatrice. Galeazzo was a participant in all his secrets and acquired so much power in Milan that Ambassador Trotti wrote to the Duke of Ferrara: ''It seems to me that this Messer Galeazzo is Duke of Milan because he can do what he wants and has what he knows how to ask and desire.''  He served his father-in-law faithfully and, although he was not as skilled in war as his brother , it was he who served as captain general of the Sforza army from 1488 until the end. It was precisely this prevarication that brought Ludovico the hatred, which later proved fatal, Gian Giacomo Trivulzio.

Although Philippe de Comines ascribed everything to a relationship of a filial nature, this strange friendship stimulated the evil tongues, to such an extent that Francesco Gonzaga openly accuses Galeazzo of prostitution and Guicciardini collects those voices that silence the Moro of sodomy:The practice of sodomy, according to the ancient Greek custom, was moreover widespread almost everywhere at that time, and many other powerful lords were not exempt from it. No basis has instead the hypothesis, advanced by Antonio Perria, according to which his nephew Gian Galeazzo was also "sexually slave of Ludovico".

Origin of the nickname "Moro" 
Ludovico earned the nickname "Moro" as a child: this is how the crowd acclaimed him when he paraded in procession in the cities of the Duchy. "Moors" were called at the time the Africans and the Saracens, so the most obvious interpretation of this nickname is that it was due to his bronze complexion, raven hair and black eyes, as visible from many of his portraits and as confirmed by the same contemporary chronicler Gian Andrea Prato:

Ludovico in art 
Ludovico and his court of artists are frequent subjects in the art of the nineteenth century, on the wave of romanticism; events such as the deep sorrow for the death of his wife Beatrice, the alleged poisoning of Duke Gian Galeazzo, the presence of artists of the calibre of Leonardo da Vinci, inspired painters such as Giambattista Gigola (1816–1820), Giuseppe Diotti (1823), Francesco Gonin (1845), Francesco Podesti (1846), Cherubino Cornienti (1840 and 1858), Eleanor Fortescue-Brickdale (1920).

Representations in popular culture

Literature 
Ludovico is the protagonist of some literary works:

Tragedies 
 La morte di Ludovico Sforza detto il Moro, by Pietro Ferrari (1791).
 Lodovico Sforza detto il Moro, by Giovanni Battista Niccolini (1833).
Lodovico il Moro, by Giuseppe Campagna (1842).
Gli Sforza by Antonio Dall'Acqua Giusti (1856).
Cicco Simonetta: dramma, with historical preface, by Carlo Belgiojoso (1858).

Novels 
 Lodovico il Moro, by Giovanni Campiglio (1837).
 La città ardente – novel by Lodovico il Moro, by Dino Bonardi (1933).
 Poisons, women and intrigues at the court of Ludovico il Moro, by Ezio Maria Seveso (1967)
I cento giorni del duca, by Laura Malinverni (2018)
Il Moro – Gli Sforza nella Milano di Leonardo, by Carlo Maria Lomartire (2019).

Comics 
 Ludovico il Moro – Signore di Milano, comic strip of 2010.

He also appears as a character in:

 Cicco Simonetta: drama, with historical preface, by Carlo Belgiojoso (1858).
 Leonardo – the Resurrection of the Gods, by Dmitry Mereskovsky (1901).
 The Duchess of Milan, by Michael Ennis (1992).
 L'invito di Ludovico il Moro, by Federico G. Martini (1998).
 The Swans of Leonardo, by Karen Essex (2006).
 The days of love and war, by Carla Maria Russo (2016).
 La misura dell'uomo, by Marco Malvaldi (2018).
 Leonardo da Vinci – The Renaissance of the Dead, by G. Albertini, G. Gualdoni and G. Staffa (2019).

Cinema 

 In the 1971 RAI miniseries The Life of Leonardo da Vinci, Ludovico is played by Giampiero Albertini.
 In the 1974 film Young Lucrezia, he is played by Piero Lulli.
 In the 1981 miniseries The Borgias, he is portrayed by Robert Ashby.
 In the 2004 film Le grandi dame di casa d'Este by Diego Ronsisvalle, he is played by Paolo Catani.
 In the 2011 Canal+ series Borgia, he appears as a cameo, played by Florian Fitz.
 In the 2011 Showtime series The Borgias, Ludovico Sforza is portrayed by English actor Ivan Kaye.
 In the 2016 documentary film Leonardo da Vinci – Il genio a Milano, he is played by Vincenzo Amato.
 In the 2016–2019 Anglo-Italian television series I Medici, he is played by Daniele Pecci.
 In the 2019 film Io, Leonardo, he is played by Massimo de Lorenzo.
 In the 2019 film Essere Leonardo da Vinci, he is played by Paolo Terenzi, although it constitutes a simple appearance.
In the 2021 series Leonardo Ludovico Sforza is portrayed by English actor James D'Arcy.

Culinary 
To Ludovico is dedicated the Dolceriso del Moro, a typical dessert of Vigevano, whose invention is traditionally attributed to the Duchess Beatrice herself, who would have conceived it in the spring of 1491 to please her illustrious consort. It is a kind of ricotta rice pudding, closed in a shortcrust pastry wrapper and enriched with candied fruit, pine nuts, almonds and rose water. This last ingredient served – as it seems – to induce harmony, harmony and fidelity in the couple.

Legends 

 Ludovico is linked to one of the legends that arose around the invention of Panettone, which would have been baked for the first time in his kitchens.
 Around the origin of the nickname Moro there is an ancient popular legend according to which Ludovico was as a child initially called "the Bull" because of his strength and impetuousness, while "il Moro" was the nickname of one of his plebeian playmate, Cesarino della Griona, who was incredibly similar to him if not for the fact of always being dirty. One day, which was Christmas 1462, the two decided as a joke to exchange roles: while Cesarino, washed and well dressed, pretended to be Ludovico in the hall of the court, the real Ludovico went down the chimney hood tied to a rope but got stuck. Cesarino himself rushed to his friend's cries for help, freeing him by tugging him by the feet. At that point Duke Francesco Sforza, seeing his son all black for the soot, judged it necessary to exchange the nicknames of the two children, and so it was that Ludovico became "the Moor", and Cesarino, for the strength demonstrated, "the Bull". It is also said that this legend is the basis of the famous story The Prince and the Pauper by Mark Twain. 
 Among the various ghosts that would inhabit the castle of Vigevano, including that of his wife Beatrice, it is also said of a white horse that was seen running down the staircase leading to the Doge's Square and here travel three laps of it before disappearing. The horse would have been the favourite of Ludovico, who would have wanted to avoid the dangers of war during the fateful defeat of Novara in 1500. In search of its master and finding the doors of the fortress barred, the animal would have beaten its hooves on the pavement of the square with such violence as to open a chasm into which it would finally fall.

Lineage 

 Legitimate children

By his wife Beatrice d'Este, daughter of Ercole I d'Este, he had the following children:

 Ercole Massimiliano, (1493–1530), count of Pavia, duke of Milan 1513 – 1515;
 Sforza Francesco, (1495–1535), Prince of Rossano and Count of Borrello 1497 – 1498, Count of Pavia and Duke of Milan 1521 – 1524 married in 1533 to Christina of Denmark (1522–1590), daughter of King Christian II of Denmark.
 The third son, also a male, was born dead and, not having been baptized, could not be placed with his mother in the tomb. Ludovico, heartbroken, therefore had him buried above the door of the cloister of Santa Maria delle Grazie with this Latin epitaph: "O unhappy childbirth! I lost my life before I was born, and more unhappy, by dying I took the life of my mother and the father deprived his wife. In so much adverse fate, this alone can be of comfort to me, that divine parents bore me, Ludovico and Beatrice dukes of Milan. 1497, January 2".

 Natural children

Il Moro also had a series of natural children, all legitimized, which over the years greatly enlarged the ducal family and allowed Sforza himself to cement some alliances:

From his mistress Bernardina de Corradis he had:

 Bianca Giovanna (1482 – Milan, 23 November 1496), married Galeazzo Sanseverino, lord of Bobbio.

By his lover Cecilia Gallerani he had one son:

 Cesare, (Milan, 1491 – 1514), abbot of the basilica of San Nazaro in Brolo in Milan from 1498, canon from 1503.

By his lover Lucrezia Crivelli he had two children:

 Giovanni Paolo I Sforza or Giampaolo I Sforza, (Milan, 14 March 1497 – Naples, 13 December 1535), from whom the Sforza branch of Caravaggio descends, married Violante Bentivoglio of the Counts of Campagna and lords of Bologna;
 A second child was born, probably, in 1500, since Lucrezia was once again pregnant when she found refuge with the Marquise Isabella d'Este.

From his lover Romana he had:

 Leone (1476 – Milan 1496), between the end of 1495 and the beginning of 1496 married the young noblewoman Margherita Grassi, already widow of his uncle Giulio Sforza, to whom he had given a son. He died shortly after the wedding without having had offspring. He is often confused with his uncle of the same name, the latter abbot of San Vittore in Vigevano since 1495.

From dark lovers he had:

 Galeazzo, eldest son, born before 1476 and died a child,,probably already before 1483, because in his first will, dating back to that year, Ludovico does not mention other children than Bianca and Leone.
 Sforza (1484/1485–1487).

Perhaps he also had another illegitimate son unknown to us if, as reported by Bernardino Corio, in 1496 three of his bastard sons died, namely Leo, Bianca, and a third who cannot be identified with any of the aforementioned.

Ancestors

Notes

References

Bibliography 

 
 
 F. Catalano, Ludovico il Moro, Dall'Oglio editore, Milano, 1985, ISBN 88-7718-599-6
 
 
 
 Mariana Frigeni, Ludovico il Moro: un gentiluomo in nero, Editoriale nuova, Milano, 1980.
 Maurizio Gattoni, Sisto IV, Innocenzo VIII e la geopolitica dello Stato Pontificio (1471–1492), Roma, Edizioni Studium 2010, ISBN 978-88-382-4124-6
 
 
 Maike Vogt-Luerssen, Die Sforza III: Isabella von Aragon und ihr Hofmaler Leonardo da Vinci, Norderstedt 2010
 Danio Asinari, Lo sguardo riscoperto di Cecilia Gallerani, Nel borgo della Dama con l'ermellino, 2020, ISBN 978-88-31949-36-1

Further reading
 Godfrey, F. M. "The Eagle and the Viper: Lodovico Il Moro of Milan: A Renaissance Tyrant." History Today (Oct 1953) 3#10 pp 705–715. 
Lodovico Sforza, in:  Thomas Gale, Encyclopedia of World Biography, 2005–2006.

External links
Portrait and family tree
Leonardo's Itinerary: Early maturity in Milan (1482–1499),  by Valentina Cupiraggi, trans.  Catherine Frost.

1452 births
1508 deaths
People from Vigevano
Ludovico
Ludovico Sforza
15th-century Italian nobility
16th-century Italian nobility
Burials at Milan Cathedral
Italian art patrons